The Coyote was an American automobile built in Redondo Beach, California, from 1909 until 1910. The car was a sporty two seat roadster with a 50 hp Straight-8 engine, which was claimed to reach 75 mph. Many parts, such as the axles and steering gear were from the Franklin Auto Company. Only two were ever made.

References

Defunct motor vehicle manufacturers of the United States
Motor vehicle manufacturers based in California